The National Cricket Performance Centre first came into existence in the winter of 2001–2002 and has been based at Loughborough University since 2003. In 2007 following the "Schofield Report" the National Academy was renamed the National Cricket Performance Centre. It consists of a state of the art £4.5 million indoor training complex. Facilities include lanes enabling full runups for fast bowlers and wicket-keepers stood back, Hawk-Eye cameras and advanced biomechanics analysis equipment. In addition to the indoor complex the academy also provides top class outdoor training facilities.

The National Academy is integrated with the England Lions cricket team, with touring parties being taken from the Academy squad.

National Cricket Performance Centre staff
Performance Director: David Parsons
ECB Performance Manager: David Graveney
ECB Elite Player Development Manager: John Abraham
National Cricket Performance Centre Manager: Dr. Guy Jackson
ECB Batting Programme Lead: Graham Thorpe
ECB Fast-Bowling Programme Lead: Kevin Shine
ECB Spin-Bowling Programme Lead: Peter Such
ECB Fielding Programme Lead: Richard Halsall
ECB Wicket-Keeping Programme Lead: Bruce French (Acting)
Physiologist: Richard Smith
National Lead Physiotherapist: Ben Langley
Information & Resource Manager: David Rose
Administrator: Jo Pearson

National Academy player intake 
Each year the best up and coming cricket talent from around Britain are invited to train with the National Academy, originally under the tutelage of Head Coach Rod Marsh and now under that of Director David Parsons. These young players are those that have been earmarked as possible players in future English cricket teams and it is for this reason that the National Academy was set up.

References

External links
 ECB National Academy
 Loughborough University Cricket

Cricket
Organisations based in Leicestershire
Sports venues in Leicestershire
Organizations established in 2003
Cricket administration in England
National Cricket Academy